Luke O'Farrell (born 25 February 1990) is an Irish hurler who plays for Cork Senior Championship club Midleton. He played for the Cork senior hurling team for seven years, during which time he usually lined out as a right corner-forward.

Playing career

Midleton CBS

O'Farrell played in all grades of hurling with Midleton CBS Secondary School before progressing onto the college's senior team. On 12 March 2006, he scored a goal from full-forward when Midelton CBS defeated St. Flannan's College from Ennis by 2-08 to 0-12 to win the Harty Cup.

Midleton

O'Farrell joined the Midleton club at a young age and played in all grades at juvenile and underage levels. On 20 November 2011, he was at full-forward when Midleton defeated Duhallow by 1-11 to 0-08 to win the Cork Under-21 Championship title for the first time in 22 years.

O'Farrell was just 17-years-old when made his senior championship debut on 5 May 2007. He scored 1-01 in a 1-11 to 0-12 defeat of Killeagh in the first round.

On 3 November 2013, O'Farrell was at right wing-forward when Midleton faced Sarsfields in the final. He scored three points from play and collected a winners' medal after the 2-15 to 2-13 victory.

O'Farrell was appointed captain of the Midleton team for the 2018 championship. On 14 October, he led the team to a 4-19 to 1-18 defeat by Imokilly in the final.

Cork

Minor and under-21

O'Farrell first played for Cork as a member of the minor team. He made his first appearance on 2 May 2007 when he scored three points from right wing-forward in Cork's 3-15 to 0-09 defeat of Waterford. On 8 July, O'Farrell was again at right corner-forward for Cork's 0-18 to 1-11 Munster Championship final defeat by Tipperary. On 2 September, he again lined out at right corner-forward in the All-Ireland final against Tipperary. O'Farrell scored a goal in the 3-14 to 2-11 defeat.

O'Farrell was also eligible for the minor grade in 2008. On 13 July, he was an unused substitute for Cork's 0-19 to 0-18 Munster Championship final defeat of Tipperary.

On 3 June 2009, O'Farrell made his first appearance for the Cork under-21 team. He scored two points from play after being introduced as a 34th-minute substitute for Robert O'Driscoll in a 2-22 to 0-25 defeat by Tipperary in the Munster Championship.

On 3 August 2011, O'Farrell, who was in his final year in the under-21 grade, lined out in the Munster Championship final. He scored 1-02 from play in the 4-20 to 1-27 extra-time defeat by Limerick. It was his last game for the Cork under-21 team.

Intermediate

O'Farrell was drafted onto the Cork intermediate team for the 2009 Munster Championship. He made his first appearance on 21 June when he scored 1-03 from full-forward in Cork's 2-15 to 1-14 defeat of Clare. On 22 July, O'Farrell won a Munster Championship medal after scoring three points in Cork's 5-24 to 3-09 defeat of Waterford in the final. On 29 August, he scored 1-02 from full-forward in Cork's 2-23 to 0-16 defeat of Kilkenny in the All-Ireland final.

Senior

O'Farrell made his first appearance for the Cork senior team on 21 March 2010. He was introduced as a half-time substitute in Cork's 3-17 to 2-20 draw with Waterford in the National League. On 2 May, O'Farrell was an unused substitute when Cork suffered a 2-22 to 1-17 defeat by Galway in the National League final. He made his first championship appearance on 17 July when he came on as a 65th-minute substitute for Kieran Murphy in Cork's 1-16 to 1-13 defeat by Waterford in the Munster Championship final replay. 

On 6 May 2012, O'Farrell lined out in his second National League final. He was held scoreless from right corner-forward in the 3-21 to 0-16 defeat by Kilkenny.

O'Farrell lined out in his second Munster Championship final on 14 July 2013. He scored a point from play in Cork's 0-24 to 0-15 defeat by Limerick. On 8 September, O'Farrell lined out at right corner-forward against Clare in the All-Ireland final. He was held scoreless in the 3-16 to 0-25 draw. O'Farrell was again at right corner-forward for the replay on 28 September and was again held scoreless in the 5-16 to 3-16 defeat.

On 3 May 2015, O'Farrell was introduced as a substitute for Rob O'Shea in Cork's 1-24 to 0-17 defeat by Waterford in the National League final.

O'Farrell won a Munster Championship medal on 9 July 2017 after coming on as a substitute for Darragh Fitzgibbon in the 1-25 to 1-20 defeat of Clare in the final.

Career statistics

Club

Inter-county

Honours

Midleton CBS
Dr. Harty Cup (1): 2006

Midleton
Cork Senior Hurling Championship (1): 2013

Cork
Munster Senior Hurling Championship (1): 2017
All-Ireland Intermediate Hurling Championship (1): 2009
Munster Intermediate Hurling Championship (1): 2009
Munster Minor Hurling Championship (1): 2008

References

External links
Luke O'Farrell profile at the Cork GAA website

1990 births
Living people
Midleton hurlers
UCC hurlers
Cork inter-county hurlers
People educated at Midleton CBS Secondary School
Alumni of Mary Immaculate College, Limerick
Alumni of University College Cork